In mathematics, the modulus of convexity and the characteristic of convexity are measures of "how convex" the unit ball in a Banach space is. In some sense, the modulus of convexity has the same relationship to the ε-δ definition of uniform convexity as the modulus of continuity does to the ε-δ definition of continuity.

Definitions

The modulus of convexity of a Banach space (X, ||·||) is the function  defined by

where S denotes the unit sphere of (X, || ||).

The characteristic of convexity of the space (X, || ||) is the number ε0 defined by

These notions are implicit in the general study of uniform convexity by J. A. Clarkson (this is the same paper containing the statements of Clarkson's inequalities).  The term "modulus of convexity" appears to be due to M. M. Day.

Properties
 The modulus of convexity, δ(ε), is a non-decreasing function of ε, and the quotient  is also non-decreasing on .  The modulus of convexity need not itself be a convex function of ε.  However, the modulus of convexity is equivalent to a convex function in the following sense: there exists a convex function δ1(ε) such that

 The normed space  is uniformly convex if and only if its characteristic of convexity ε0 is equal to 0, i.e., if and only if  for every .
 The Banach space  is a strictly convex space (i.e., the boundary of the unit ball B contains no line segments) if and only if δ(2) = 1, i.e., if only antipodal points (of the form x and y = −x) of the unit sphere can have distance equal to 2.
 When X is uniformly convex, it admits an equivalent norm with power type modulus of convexity. Namely, there exists  and a constant  such that

Modulus of convexity of the LP spaces

The modulus of convexity is known for the LP spaces. If , then it satisfies the following implicit equation:

Knowing that  one can suppose that .

For , one has the explicit expression

Therefore, .

See also 
Uniformly smooth space

Notes

References
 

 Fuster, Enrique Llorens. Some moduli and constants related to metric fixed point theory. Handbook of metric fixed point theory, 133-175, Kluwer Acad. Publ., Dordrecht, 2001. 
 Lindenstrauss, Joram and Benyamini, Yoav. Geometric nonlinear functional analysis Colloquium publications, 48. American Mathematical Society.
.
 Vitali D. Milman. Geometric theory of Banach spaces II. Geometry of the unit sphere. Uspechi Mat. Nauk, vol. 26, no. 6, 73-149, 1971; Russian Math. Surveys, v. 26 6, 80-159.

Banach spaces
Convex analysis